William Thomas Sperrin (9 April 1922 – 21 June 2000) was an English football inside forward and coach. He made 100 appearances as a player for Brentford and was later a member of the coaching staff at Hillingdon Borough for 12 years.

Club career

Early years 
An inside forward, Sperrin began his career as an amateur at Second Division club Tottenham Hotspur and also represented Middlesex Schools. His career was interrupted by the outbreak of the Second World War in 1939, but he managed to make 27 wartime appearances for the club, scoring six goals. He also played as a guest for Clapton Orient, Fulham, Millwall, Bradford Park Avenue, Brighton & Hove Albion and Chelsea during the war. After the war, Sperrin dropped into non-league football and had a short spell at Athenian League club Finchley and then spent a season with Southern League club Guildford City.

Brentford 
Sperrin joined Second Division club Brentford in September 1949 and made his debut in a 1–1 draw with Sheffield Wednesday at Griffin Park on 1 October 1949. He gradually broke into the team and scored 11 goals in 35 appearances during the 1951–52 season. Sperrin's appearances subsequently tailed off and he made just 23 appearances between August 1952 and his final appearance in September 1956. In 1956, he was jointly awarded a testimonial with George Bristow, Ken Horne and Reg Newton against an International Managers XI. Sperrin made 100 appearances and scored 30 goals during his seven years at Griffin Park.

Non-league football 
Sperrin dropped back into non-league football in 1956, linking up with fellow Brentford departee Reg Newton at Kent League First Division club Tunbridge Wells United. He ended his career with a 14-year spell at Southern League club Hillingdon Borough and finally North Greenford United.

Coaching career 
After his retirement as a player, Sperrin went on to serve Yiewsley (later named Hillingdon Borough) for 12 years in the trainer, coach, assistant manager and caretaker manager roles. As assistant manager, he had the honour of leading the team out for the 1971 FA Trophy final at Wembley Stadium, as player-manager Jim Langley had included himself in the starting lineup.

Personal life 
Sperrin's brother James was also a footballer and the brothers' early careers mirrored each other, with both on the books at Tottenham Hotspur and later signing for Finchley. Sperrin's son Martyn was also a footballer.

Honours 
Hillingdon Borough
 Southern League First Division second-place promotion: 1965–66

Career statistics

References

1922 births
2000 deaths
Footballers from Wood Green
English footballers
Association football inside forwards
Tottenham Hotspur F.C. players
Finchley F.C. players
Guildford City F.C. players
Brentford F.C. players
Tunbridge Wells F.C. players
Hillingdon Borough F.C. players
English Football League players
Southern Football League players
Clapton Orient F.C. wartime guest players
Fulham F.C. wartime guest players
Millwall F.C. wartime guest players
Bradford (Park Avenue) A.F.C. wartime guest players
Brighton & Hove Albion F.C. wartime guest players
Chelsea F.C. wartime guest players
North Greenford United F.C. players
Kent Football League (1894–1959) players